WS3  can refer to:

 WS3, a candidate phylum of bacteria from the Wurtsmith contaminated aquifer
 Waardenburg syndrome type III
 Weapons Storage and Security System